Henninger Turm (Henninger Tower) was a grain storage silo located in the Sachsenhausen-Süd district of Frankfurt, Germany. It was built by Henninger Brewery (now part of the Binding Brewery/Radeberger Group) and had a storage capacity of 16,000 tons of barley.  The , 33-storey, reinforced concrete tower was designed by Karl Lieser and was built from 1959 to 1961. It was inaugurated on 18 May 1961. It was demolished in 2013. Until 1974 it was the tallest building in Frankfurt; and it remained the tallest storage silo in the world until its demolition.

On top of the building was a barrel-like pod which contained a viewing platform and a revolving restaurant (originally two). In October 2002, the tower was closed to the public. From 1961 to 2008, the annual professional cycling race Rund um den Henninger-Turm was held on 1 May, the course circling the tower multiple times.

Neuer Henninger Turm 
In November 2012, it was announced that Henninger Turm would be demolished because it was too costly and uneconomic for renovation. Demolition began in January 2013 and was completed by the end of the year. Being inspired by the former Henninger Turm, the design was conceived by the architects Meixner Schlüter Wendt. Whereas both the contours and the side facing the city are strongly reminiscent of the original appearance of the old silo, the three other sides clearly indicate the new building's function as a residential tower. It contains 209 luxury apartments. The cornerstone for this project was laid in June 2014 and the tower was completed in summer 2017.

See also
List of towers
Schapfen Mill Tower, a 115-meter silo near Ulm

References

Infrastructure completed in 1961
Buildings and structures with revolving restaurants
Skyscrapers in Frankfurt
Residential skyscrapers in Germany
1961 establishments in West Germany